Miss Earth 2015, the 15th edition of the Miss Earth pageant, was held on 5 December 2015 at Marx Halle in Vienna, Austria. Jamie Herrell of the Philippines crowned her compatriot Angelia Ong as successor at the end of the event. It was the first time the pageant was held in Europe outside of Asia. It was also the first ever back-to-back victory in Miss Earth history.

At the end of the night, Australia got its highest placement to date through Dayanna Grageda's finish as Miss Earth-Air 2015 where she was crowned by Andrea Neu, Miss Earth-Air 2014 from United States; Brittany Payne of United States was crowned Miss Earth-Water 2015, and Thiessa Sickert of Brazil was crowned as Miss Earth-Fire 2015 and she was crowned by Anastasia Trusova, Miss Earth-Fire 2014 from Russia.

The theme of this year's pageant was the promotion of environmental awareness by focusing on the Climate Change campaign thru the 5R's :   Re-think, Reduce, Re-use, Recycle and Respect.

Results

Placements

Order of announcements

Top 16

Top 8

Judges

Pre-pageant activities

Medal tally

Challenge Events

Best Eco Video

Photogenic Award (Online Voting)

Swimsuit Competition

Miss Friendship

National Costume Competition

Cocktail Wear Competition

Charity Givers

Sports Competition

Talent Competition

Evening Gown Competition

Tree Planting

Darling of the Press

Snowman Building Competition

Special Activity Awards

Presenters
 Oli Pettigrew
 Joey Mead-King
 Katia Wagner (Miss Earth - Air 2013)

Music
Opening: "Flawless" (Remix) by Beyoncé
Top 16 Announcement: "Confident" (Instrument) by Demi Lovato
Swimsuit Competition: "Sparks" (The Golden Pony Remix) by Hilary Duff
Evening Gown Competition: "Lean On" (Violin cover) by Major Lazer and DJ Snake ft. MØ
Top 8 Announcement: "Masterpiece" (Instrument) by Jessie J

Contestants
The following are the 86 delegates who competed for the Miss Earth crown:

Other Pageant Notes

Debuts
Countries and territories have been confirmed to debut this year:

Returns
Countries and territories which has previously competed and will return this year:

Last competed in 2003:

Last competed in 2008:

Last competed in 2011:

Last competed in 2012:

Last competed in 2013:

Withdrawals

 
 Chinese Taipei

Did not compete
 : Erica Urwibutso

Designations
: Lilit Martirosyan has been appointed as the first Miss Earth Armenia for 2015. She was Top Model of the World for Armenia in 2015.
: Sophie Totzauer has been appointed as Miss Earth Austria for 2015 by the national director of Miss Earth Austria, Sina Schmid.
: Thiessa Sickert has been appointed as Miss Earth Brazil 2015 by Miss Earth Brazil Organization. She was Miss Universe Brasil 2012 2nd Runner-up.
: Estefania Muñoz has been appointed as Miss Earth Colombia 2015 by Miss Earth Colombia Organization. The next Miss Earth Colombia pageant would be held in early 2016.
: Daria Zeleneva has been appointed as Miss Earth Crimea for 2015. Crimea appointed Zeleneva as there was no national pageant held and highly possible to be held the following year due to the recent conflict in Crimea.
: Ana Marija Jurišić has been appointed as Miss Earth Croatia 2015 by the national director of Miss Earth Croatia. Jurišić competed and won the "No1 Model of the World 2015" competition held in Serbia where she represented Bosnia and Herzegovina.
: Marcella Marina Constantinou has been appointed as Miss Earth Cyprus 2015. She won the Star Cyprus 2014 pageant. 
: Angela Bonilla has been appointed as Miss Earth Ecuador 2015 by its national director, José Hidalgo León. The national pageant for Miss Earth was postponed and would be materialized the next year. Bonilla participated at Miss Ecuador 2015 and Miss World Ecuador 2013 where she both went unplaced.
: Imaj Ahmed Hassan has been appointed to represent Egypt by Youssef Spahi, national director of Miss Egypt after the pageant was postponed until spring of the following year. Hassan was a Miss Egypt 2014 Top 10 finalist.
: Shyla Angela Prasad has been appointed as Miss Earth Fiji 2015. Shyla was a finalist at Miss World Australia. 
: Alyssa Wurtz has been appointed as Miss Earth France 2015 by Miss France Organization. She is Miss France 2015 Fourth Runner-up.
: Melanie Sofia Bauer has been appointed as Miss Earth Germany 2015 by Sina Schmid, the national director of Miss Earth for Germany. Melanie was a contestant at Miss Earth Austria 2015. 
: Sara Guerrero has been appointed as Miss Earth Guatemala 2015 by Miss Guatemala Latina. She was Miss International Guatemala 2013.
: Joelle Curoe was appointed as Miss Earth Ireland 2015 by the national director. Joelle also competed at Miss Earth Northern Ireland 2015 and finished as Miss Earth – Air 2015. 
: Shams Touraani has been appointed as Miss Earth Israel 2015 by the Miss Earth director in Israel, Lilac Magazine.
: Aurora Pianegonda was appointed by the national director, [Life TV] Channel, as Miss Earth Italy 2015. Aurora is the Miss Lady Veneto 2015. 
: Kaltrina Neziri has been appointed to represent Kosovo by Agnesa Vuthaj, national director of Miss Earth Kosovo. Neziri was crowned as Miss Earth Kosovo 2014 and was supposed to compete the previous year. However, she was not able to compete because her visa application was denied. 
: Bayartsetseg Altangerel was appointed as Miss Earth Mongolia 2015 by the national director, Miss Mongolia Tourism Association. Bayartsetseg competed at Miss International 2014. This year, she competed at Miss World Mongolia 2015, and placed 1st Runner-up.
: Leena Asarfi has been appointed as Miss Earth Netherlands 2015 by 12 Months of Beauty organization.
: Carmen Jaramillo was chosen to compete as Miss Earth Panama 2015 by the national director, Cesar Añel after being granted to him the franchise. Miss Earth Panama would hold its first national pageant for the following year. Carmen is also the Miss Reina Hispanoamericana Panama 2015.
: Magdalena Ho was appointed as Miss Earth Poland 2015 by its new national director, Serafina Ogończyk-Mąkowska of Miss Egzotica. Magdalena won as Miss Egzotica 2014.
: Anca Neculaiasa-Pavel was appointed as Miss Earth Romania 2015. She was Miss International Romania 2015
: Danielle Dolabaille has been appointed as Miss Earth Trinidad and Tobago 2015 after series of casting calls.
: Şevval Ayvaz has been appointed as Miss Earth Turkey 2015 by the national director, Elidor Miss Turkey. During the finals night, Sevval was proclaimed as Miss International Turkey but turned out wrong as she finished only as a finalist.
: Chavika Watrsang has been appointed as Miss Earth Thailand 2015 by Miss Universe Thailand organization after the said organization got the license back. Chavika is the 1st Runner-up of Miss Universe Thailand 2015.

Replacements
: Vinka Nemer Drpic, the Miss World Bolivia 2015 1st runner up, became the Miss Earth Bolivia 2015 after Jazmin Duran withdraws as Miss Earth Bolivia 2015 due to health reasons.
: Cristelle Lohembe replaced Jessica Bossekota as Miss Earth Congo DR 2015 for undisclosed reasons.
: Claudia Martínez was replaced by Pamela Valdivieso for undisclosed reasons. Pamela Valdivieso is the Miss Earth El Salvador 2015 and would have been competed the following year. 
: Britt Roselyn Rekkedal replaced Dina Nielsen as Miss Earth Norway 2015 for undisclosed reasons.
: Andrea Melgarejo replaced Myriam Arévalos as Myriam has been assigned to participate in Miss Universe 2015 after Laura Garcete was dethroned for being pregnant.
: Andrea Panocchia was replaced by Dolores Ortega Martinez as Miss Earth Spain 2015 for undisclosed reasons. Martinez is the Miss Earth Spain 2015 First Runner-up. 
: Sandra Akello replaced the original winner, Pearl Asasira, as Miss Earth Uganda 2015 for undisclosed reasons. Sandra is the Miss Earth Uganda 2015 1st runner up.

Controversies
 Miss Taiwan R.O.C. Wen-Yin Ting was ejected from the competition due to her refusal to exchange her initial sash that said "Taiwan R.O.C." for one that said "Chinese Taipei" after China pressured the organization to make the change.
 Miss Earth India Aaital Khosla has garnered a lot of negative criticism after Miss Earth India's eco-video showed parts of Nepalese landscapes as one of her own nation. The video showcased the hills and mountain ranges including Mount Everest and the traffic scenes of Nepal's cities. It also indicated that the Miss Earth India organization failed to cross check the facts, plagiarized the video clips, completing the eco-video in haste without any prior responsibility. Amid much criticism, Miss Earth India Organization, owned by Glamanand Super Model India, together with Aaital Khosla then apologized to the Nepalese citizens and the world.

Notes

References

External links
 

2015
2015 beauty pageants
Beauty pageants in Austria
2015 in Austria